Penetrance in genetics is the proportion of individuals carrying a particular variant (or allele) of a gene (the genotype) that also expresses an associated trait (the phenotype). In medical genetics, the penetrance of a disease-causing mutation is the proportion of individuals with the mutation that exhibit clinical symptoms among all individuals with such mutation. For example, if a mutation in the gene responsible for a particular autosomal dominant disorder has 95% penetrance, then 95% of those with the mutation will develop the disease, while 5% will not.

A condition, most commonly inherited in an autosomal dominant manner, is said to show complete penetrance if clinical symptoms are present in all individuals who have the disease-causing mutation. A condition which shows complete penetrance is neurofibromatosis type 1 – every person who has a mutation in the gene will show symptoms of the condition. The penetrance is 100%.

Common examples used to show degrees of penetrance are often highly penetrant. There are several reasons for this:
 Highly penetrant alleles, and highly heritable symptoms, are easier to demonstrate, because if the allele is present, the phenotype is generally expressed. Mendelian genetic concepts such as recessiveness, dominance, and co-dominance are fairly simple additions to this principle.
 Alleles which are highly penetrant are more likely to be noticed by clinicians and geneticists, and alleles for symptoms which are highly heritable are more likely to be inferred to exist, and then are more easily tracked down.

Degrees 
 Complete and incomplete or reduced penetrance: An allele is said to have complete penetrance if all individuals who have the disease-causing mutation have clinical symptoms of the disease. In incomplete or reduced penetrance, some individuals will not express the trait even though they carry the allele. An example of an autosomal dominant condition showing incomplete penetrance is familial breast cancer due to mutations in the BRCA1 gene. Females with a mutation in this gene have an 80% lifetime risk of developing breast cancer. The penetrance of the condition is therefore 80%.
 High and low penetrance:  If an allele is highly penetrant, then the trait it produces will almost always be apparent in an individual carrying the allele.  An allele with low penetrance will only occasionally produce the trait with which it is associated. In cases of low penetrance, it can be difficult to distinguish environmental from genetic factors.

Determination 
Penetrance can be difficult to determine reliably, even for genetic diseases that are caused by a single polymorphic allele. For many hereditary diseases, the onset of symptoms is age related, and is affected by environmental factors such as nutrition and smoking, as well as genetic cofactors and epigenetic regulation of expression:
 Age-related cumulative frequency: Penetrance is often expressed as a frequency of disease at different ages. For example, multiple endocrine neoplasia type 1, a hereditary disorder characterized by parathyroid hyperplasia and pancreatic islet-cell and pituitary adenomas, is caused by a mutation in the menin gene (MEN1) on human chromosome 11q13. In one study the age-related penetrance of MEN1 was 7% by age 10 but nearly 100% by age 60.
 Environmental modifiers: Penetrance may be affected by environmental factors. For example, several studies of BRCA1 and BRCA2 mutations, associated with an elevated risk of breast and ovarian cancer in women, have examined associations with environmental and behavioral modifiers such as pregnancies, history of breast feeding, smoking, diet, and so forth.
 Genetic modifiers: Penetrance at a given allele may be polygenic, modified by the presence or absence of polymorphic alleles at other gene loci. Genetic association studies may assess the influence of such variants on the penetrance of an allele.
 Epigenetic regulation: Epigenetics can affect the penetrance of genes through genomic imprinting by the paternal or maternal allele or epigenetic regulation resulting from environmental or other personal factors.

Ascertainment bias 
A consensus definition of what constitutes the presence of a phenotype is essential for determining the penetrance of an allele. For hereditary hemochromatosis, a disease caused by excess intestinal iron absorption, the degree of penetrance has been a subject of controversy for many years and illustrates the challenges facing investigators seeking a quantitative measure of penetrance. Individuals who are homozygotes for the C282Y allele of the HFE gene are at risk for developing lethal concentrations of iron, particularly in the liver.  Typically patients develop clinical disease in late-middle age.

Determining the penetrance of the C282Y allele can be influenced when the medical community evaluates homozygotes. Many of those afflicted do not seek treatment until symptoms are advanced, and with age-related conditions, some individuals die first of other causes. This dilemma is known as an ascertainment bias. There can be a bias favoring only the ascertainment of the most severely affected, or there can be a bias in the other direction, deeming that a homozygote is affected with the disease if they simply have elevated blood iron levels, but no physiological evidence of organ disease such as cirrhosis.

Attributable risk 
For alleles with incomplete penetrance, the penetrance of the allele is not the same as the attributable risk. For example, many alleles have been shown, through association studies, to cause some form of cancer, often with low penetrance. But cases of the cancer would arise even without the presence of the allele. Attributable risk is that proportion of total risk that can be attributed to the presence of the allele.

Polygenic traits 
Most biological traits (such as height or intelligence in humans) are multifactorial, influenced by many genes as well as environmental conditions and epigenetic expression. Only a statistical measure of association is possible with such polygenic traits.

See also
 Expressivity

References

External links
 Tutorial about the different aspects of genetic penetrance.

Medical genetics